The Kodak Building is a historic building in Atlanta, Georgia. Built in midtown Atlanta around 1950, the building originally served as a camera shop, with a large sign on top of the building advertising Kodak considered a local landmark. The building has been vacant for several years, but was recently sold and is scheduled for redevelopment.

History 
The building was originally built around 1950 as a camera shop for Star Photo. It was built simultaneously to the building next to it, which currently houses the Atlanta Eagle, a gay bar that was the subject of the Atlanta Eagle police raid in 2009. The building was eventually converted to a Kodak shop, and during this time a large advertising sign for the company was added to the top of the building, which remains on the building today. In the early 2000s, the building served as the campaign headquarters for Shirley Franklin's team during her campaign to become mayor of Atlanta.

Around 2009, the Kodak Building and Atlanta Eagle building were foreclosed on. The two buildings were sold in May 2014, with the Atlanta Eagle's lease renewed. As part of the sale agreement, the Kodak sign was to remain on the building. The buildings were sold again in 2016 for approximately $2 million, with plans to convert the Kodak Building into a healthcare center.

On November 11, 2020, the Georgia Trust for Historic Preservation listed the "Atlanta Eagle and Kodak Buildings" on its annual list of Places in Peril.

References

External links 

 

1950 establishments in Georgia (U.S. state)
Buildings and structures in Atlanta
Commercial buildings completed in 1950
Kodak